Abasolo is both a municipality and a town in the Mexican state of Nuevo Leon. The municipality was named in honor of José Mariano Abasolo, who participated in the Mexican War of Independence.

Location

The municipality of Abasolo is located in the central western region of the state, in the Salinas Valley.

The municipality limits with the following municipalities, all within Nuevo León: to the North with Salinas Victoria; to the South and West with Hidalgo and Salinas Victoria; to the east with El Carmen.

Climate

The prevailing climate in the municipality is temperate and hot, with an average temperature of 18 °C; May and June are the warmest months. Average annual rainfall is between 400 and 500 millimeters; August, September and October are the rainy season.

Population centers

The municipality has a total of 13 population centers, of which the following are the largest:
The municipal seat, also named Abasolo, which had a population of 1,780 in 1995
Kilómetro 21, population 69
Viveros Dávila (La Laborcita), population 25
Dolores
Los Ligueros
Agapita
Arroyo Báez
Huerta Magdalena

References

External links
https://web.archive.org/web/20061104164538/http://www.abasolonl.gob.mx/

Municipalities of Nuevo León